Two Mafiamen in the Far West  is a 1964  Italian  comedy western film directed by Giorgio Simonelli. Its stars Franco and Ciccio, and Fernando Sancho.

Cast
 Franco Franchi as  Franco Capone
 Ciccio Ingrassia as  Ciccio Capone
 Fernando Sancho as  Rio
 Aroldo Tieri as Ramirez
 Hélène Chanel as  Betty Blanc
 Mimmo Poli as  Uomo al saloon
 Ana Casares as  Mary Simpson
 Aldo Giuffrè as Avvocato difesa
 Adriano Micantoni as  Ramon
 Luis Peña as  Giudice Williams
 Félix Dafauce as Il becchino
 Alfredo Rizzo as  Colonel Peabody
 Vittorio Bonos as  Mano Gialla
 Ignazio Spalla as Uomo con Rio
 José Torres as Pablito
 Giovanni Vari as Un giudice
 Stelio Tanzini as  Il guercio
 Loretta Gagliardini as  Maria
 Vincenzo Falanga as  Primo giudice
 Tony Di Mitri as Jesse James
 Olimpia Cavalli as  Calamity Jane
 Lanfranco Ceccarelli as  Un detenuto (as Franco Ceccarelli)
 Enzo Andronico as  L'avvocato dell'accusa
 Mario Brega as  Uomo con Rio

External links 
 

1964 films
1964 comedy films
1964 drama films
1960s buddy comedy films
Films directed by Giorgio Simonelli
Films set in Italy
Italian Western (genre) comedy films
Italian buddy comedy films
1960s Italian-language films
Spaghetti Western films
1960s Italian films